Hesperaloe (false yucca) is a genus of flowering plants in the family Asparagaceae, subfamily Agavoideae.  It contains perennial yucca-like plants with long, narrow leaves produced in a basal rosette and flowers borne on long panicles or racemes.  The species are native to the arid parts of Texas in the United States and Mexico and are sometimes cultivated as xerophytic ornamental plants.

The genus name is derived from the Greek word έσπερος (hesperos), meaning "western," and aloe, which the plants resemble.

Species
Accepted species:

References

External links

Agavoideae
Asparagaceae genera
North American desert flora
Flora of Northeastern Mexico
Flora of Northwestern Mexico
Flora of Texas
Taxa named by George Engelmann